Ladies Must Live is a 1940 American romantic comedy film directed by Noel M. Smith and starring Wayne Morris, Rosemary Lane and Lee Patrick.

It is a B movie produced by the major Hollywood studio Warner Brothers. The film's sets were designed by the art director Esdras Hartley.

Cast
 Wayne Morris as Corey Lake  
 Rosemary Lane as Pat Halliday  
 Lee Patrick as Mary Larrabee  
 Roscoe Karns as Pete H. "Pighead" Larrabee 
 George Reeves as George Halliday  
 Ferris Taylor as Paul Halliday  
 Lottie Williams as Mrs. Laura Halliday  
 William Hopper as Joe Barton
 Cliff Saum as Chief Thunderbird, Corey's Indian Valet 
 Billy Dawson as Tommy "Tom"  
 Mildred Gover as Lettie, Pat's maid  
 Margaret Hayes as Chorus girl  
 Mildred Coles as Chorus girl 
 Phyllis Hamilton as Hat check girl  
 Wendell Niles as Radio commentator (voice)
 Leo White as Pierre, Headwaiter of Club Two-Time

References
Notes

Bibliography
 Bubbeo, Daniel. The Women of Warner Brothers. McFarland, 2001.

External links
 

1940 films
1940 romantic comedy films
American romantic comedy films
Films directed by Noel M. Smith
American black-and-white films
1940s English-language films
1940s American films